Andrzej Józwowicz (born 14 January 1965) is a Polish prelate of the Catholic Church who joined the diplomatic service of the Holy See in 1997 and serves as the Apostolic Nuncio to Iran. An archbishop since 2017, he was Apostolic Nuncio to Rwanda from 2017 to 2021.

Biography
Andrzej Józwowicz was born on 14 January 1965 in Boćki, Poland. He was ordained a priest on 24 May 1990. He studied philosophy and theology in Warsaw. He earned a doctorate in canon and civil law from the Pontifical Lateran University in Rome.

To prepare for a diplomat's career he entered the Pontifical Ecclesiastical Academy in 1995. He speaks Italian, French, English, Polish, Portuguese and Russian.

On 1 July 1997 he joined the Holy See's diplomatic service. He served in Mozambique, Thailand, Singapore, Cambodia, Hungary, Syria and Iran. In 2012 he was appointed secretary in the Apostolic Nunciature to Russia.

Józwowicz was appointed Apostolic Nuncio to Rwanda on 18 March 2017. Pope Francis named him Nuncio to Iran on 28 June 2021.

See also
 List of heads of the diplomatic missions of the Holy See

References

Polish Roman Catholic titular archbishops
1965 births
Living people
Apostolic Nuncios to Rwanda
Apostolic Nuncios to Iran
Pontifical Lateran University alumni
Pontifical Ecclesiastical Academy alumni